The Cellar and Point is an American "garage-chamber'" septet from New York City. Formed by drummer/producer/composer Joseph Branciforte and guitarist/composer Christopher Botta in 2010, the group's music draws from jazz, contemporary classical music, post-rock, electronica, and ambient music. Their debut record, Ambit, was released in 2014 on Cuneiform Records. The album was awarded 9/10 stars by AllMusic who called it "one of 2014's finest albums of challenging, engaging, and genre-defying contemporary music” and was included among Soundcheck host John Schaefer's Top 10 Albums of 2014.

Music
The band has referred to its music as "garage-chamber," although it has alternatively been called "chamber-prog," "contemporary chamber jazz," and "post-everything." The group's core instrumentation consists of two guitars, bass, drums, vibraphone, violin, and cello, but is often extended to include banjo, piano, viola, glockenspiel, keyboards, and electronics. In addition to original compositions by co-leaders Branciforte and Botta, the group has performed and recorded arrangements of 20th century composers such as Anton Webern and György Ligeti. Past and present members currently perform with JACK Quartet, The Claudia Quintet, and Bing & Ruth.

Members
Joe Bergen — vibraphone
Christopher Botta — acoustic guitar, banjo, composition
Joseph Branciforte — drums, piano, composition
Greg Chudzik — electric bass
Kevin McFarland — cello
Terrence McManus — electric guitar
Christopher Otto — violin, viola

Discography
 Ambit (2014) Cuneiform Records

Notes

External links
 

American jazz ensembles from New York City
Septets
Musical groups established in 2010
Cuneiform Records artists
2010 establishments in New York City